North Branch is a NJ Transit railroad station on the Raritan Valley Line, in the hamlet of North Branch in Branchburg, New Jersey.  The station is in a residential area, a mile to the south of North Branch center.  The station has a small shelter with no facilities and is across the street from the Printmaking Council of New Jersey.  North Branch station and the stations west of it have no weekend service. The former Jersey Central Railroad station depot burned to the ground on January 8, 1970.

Station layout
The station has a single low-level asphalt side platform.

References

External links 

 Station from Station Road from Google Maps Street View

NJ Transit Rail Operations stations
Railway stations in Somerset County, New Jersey
Branchburg, New Jersey
Former Central Railroad of New Jersey stations
1848 establishments in New Jersey
Railway stations in the United States opened in 1848